Al-Nahda Club may refer to:
 Al-Nahda Club (Oman), an Omani sports club based in Al-Buraimi
 Al-Nahda Club (Saudi Arabia), a Saudi football club from Al-Khobar
 Al Nahda SC, a defunct Lebanese football club